As Time Goes By is the posthumous fourteenth and final studio album by American music duo Carpenters. It was initially released in Japan on August 1, 2001. An international release was originally to follow soon thereafter, but the release of the album generated copyright discrepancies among several publishers. These discrepancies were not resolved until late 2003, delaying the album's international date of release until April 13, 2004.

Track listing

Singles
"The Rainbow Connection"
CD single UICY-5006
"The Rainbow Connection"
"Leave Yesterday Behind"
"Medley (Superstar/Rainy Days and Mondays)"

JP CD promo (2001) SIC-1039
"The Rainbow Connection"
"Leave Yesterday Behind"

Charts

References

External links
 The Carpenters - As Time Goes By (2001) album releases & credits at Discogs

2001 albums
2004 albums
The Carpenters albums
A&M Records albums
Albums published posthumously